Anguish (Spanish: Angustia) is a 1947 Spanish crime film directed by José Antonio Nieves Conde and starring Rafael Bardem, Julia Caba Alba and María Francés.

Cast
 Rafael Bardem as Inspector  
 Julia Caba Alba as Lula  
 María Francés as Sra. Jarque  
 Milagros Leal as Olivia  
 Carmen de Lucio as Isabel  
 Fernando Nogueras as Canel  
 Adriano Rimoldi as Marcos  
 Amparo Rivelles as Elena  
 José María Rodero as Andrés  
 Aníbal Vela as Sr. Marí  
 Ángel Álvarez as Bibliotecario

References

Bibliography 
 D'Lugo, Marvin. Guide to the Cinema of Spain. Greenwood Publishing, 1997.

External links 
 

1947 crime films
Spanish crime films
1947 films
1940s Spanish-language films
Films directed by José Antonio Nieves Conde
Spanish black-and-white films
1940s Spanish films